Mars Express is a space exploration mission being conducted by the European Space Agency (ESA). The Mars Express mission is exploring the planet Mars, and is the first planetary mission attempted by the agency. "Express" originally referred to the speed and efficiency with which the spacecraft was designed and built. However, "Express" also describes the spacecraft's relatively short interplanetary voyage, a result of being launched when the orbits of Earth and Mars brought them closer than they had been in about 60,000 years.

Mars Express consists of two parts, the Mars Express Orbiter and Beagle 2, a lander designed to perform exobiology and geochemistry research. Although the lander failed to fully deploy after it landed on the Martian surface, the orbiter has been successfully performing scientific measurements since early 2004, namely, high-resolution imaging and mineralogical mapping of the surface, radar sounding of the subsurface structure down to the permafrost, precise determination of the atmospheric circulation and composition, and study of the interaction of the atmosphere with the interplanetary medium.

Due to the valuable science return and the highly flexible mission profile, Mars Express has been granted several mission extensions. The latest was approved on 1 October 2020 and runs until 31 December 2022.

Some of the instruments on the orbiter, including the camera systems and some spectrometers, reuse designs from the failed launch of the Russian Mars 96 mission in 1996 (European countries had provided much of the instrumentation and financing for that unsuccessful mission). The design of Mars Express is based on ESA's Rosetta mission, on which a considerable sum was spent on development. The same design was also used for ESA's Venus Express mission in order to increase reliability and reduce development cost and time. Because of these redesigns and repurposings, the total cost of the project was about $345 million- less than half of comparable U.S. missions.

Arriving at Mars in 2003,  ago (and counting), it is the second longest surviving, continually active spacecraft in orbit around a planet other than Earth, behind only NASA's still active 2001 Mars Odyssey.

Mission profile and timeline overview

Mission overview 
The Mars Express mission is dedicated to the orbital (and originally in-situ) study of the interior, subsurface, surface and atmosphere, and environment of the planet Mars.
The scientific objectives of the Mars Express mission represent an attempt to fulfill in part the lost scientific goals of the Russian Mars 96 mission, complemented by exobiology research with Beagle-2. Mars exploration is crucial for a better understanding of the Earth from the perspective of comparative planetology.

The spacecraft originally carried seven scientific instruments, a small lander, a lander relay and a Visual Monitoring Camera, all designed to contribute to solving the mystery of Mars' missing water. All of the instruments take measurements of the surface, atmosphere and interplanetary media, from the main spacecraft in polar orbit, which will allow it to gradually cover the whole planet.

The total initial Mars Express budget excluding the lander was €150 million. The prime contractor for the construction of Mars Express orbiter was EADS Astrium Satellites.

Mission preparation 
In the years preceding the launch of a spacecraft numerous teams of experts distributed over the contributing companies and organisations prepared the space and ground segments. Each of these teams focussed on the area of its responsibility and interfacing as required. A major additional requirement raised for the Launch and Early Orbit Phase (LEOP) and all critical operational phases was that it was not enough merely to interface; the teams had to be integrated into one Mission Control Team. All the different experts had to work together in an operational environment and the interaction and interfaces between all elements of the system (software, hardware and human) had to run smoothly for this to happen:

 the flight operations procedures had to be written and validated down to the smallest detail;
 the control system had to be validated;
 system Validation Tests (SVTs) with the satellite had to be performed to demonstrate the correct interfacing of the ground and space segments;
 mission Readiness Test with the Ground Stations had to be performed;
 a Simulations Campaign was run.

Launch 

The spacecraft was launched on June 2, 2003, at 23:45 local time (17:45 UT, 1:45 p.m. EDT) from Baikonur Cosmodrome in Kazakhstan, using a Soyuz-FG/Fregat rocket. The Mars Express and Fregat booster were initially put into a 200 km Earth parking orbit, then the Fregat was fired again at 19:14 UT to put the spacecraft into a Mars transfer orbit. The Fregat and Mars Express separated at approximately 19:17 UT. The solar panels were then deployed and a trajectory correction manoeuvre was performed on June 4 to aim Mars Express towards Mars and allow the Fregat booster to coast into interplanetary space. The Mars Express was the first Russian-launched probe to successfully make it out of low Earth orbit since the Soviet Union fell.

Near Earth commissioning phase 
The Near Earth commissioning phase extended from the separation of the spacecraft from the launcher upper stage until the completion of the initial check out of the orbiter and payload. It included the solar array deployment, the initial attitude acquisition, the declamping of the Beagle-2 spin-up mechanism, the injection error correction manoeuvre and the first commissioning of the spacecraft and payload (final commissioning of payload took place after Mars Orbit Insertion). The payload was checked out one instrument at a time. This phase lasted about one month.

The interplanetary cruise phase 
This five month phase lasted from the end of the Near Earth Commissioning phase until one month prior to the Mars capture manoeuvre and included trajectory correction manoeuvres and payloads calibration. The payload was mostly switched off during the cruise phase, with the exception of some intermediate check-outs.
Although it was originally meant to be a "quiet cruise" phase, It soon became obvious that this "cruise" would be indeed very busy. There were star Tracker problems, a power wiring problem, extra manoeuvres, and on October 28, the spacecraft was hit by one of the largest solar flares ever recorded.

Lander jettison 
The Beagle 2 lander was released on December 19, 2003, at 8:31 UTC (9:31 CET) on a ballistic cruise towards the surface. It entered Mars' atmosphere on the morning of December 25. Landing was expected to occur at about 02:45 UT on December 25 (9:45 p.m. EST December 24). However, after repeated attempts to contact the lander failed using the Mars Express craft and the NASA Mars Odyssey orbiter, it was declared lost on February 6, 2004, by the Beagle 2 management board. An inquiry was held and its findings were published later that year.

Orbit insertion 

Mars Express arrived at Mars after a 400 million km journey and course corrections in September and in December 2003.

On December 20 Mars Express fired a short thruster burst to put it into position to orbit the planet. The Mars Express orbiter then fired its main engine and went into a highly elliptical initial-capture orbit of 250 km × 150,000 km with an inclination of 25 degrees on December 25 at 03:00 UT (10:00 p.m., December 24 EST).

First evaluation of the orbital insertion showed that the orbiter had reached its first milestone at Mars. The orbit was later adjusted by four more main engine firings to the desired 259 km × 11,560 km near-polar (86 degree inclination) orbit with a period of 7.5 hours. Near periapsis (nearest to Mars) the top deck is pointed down towards the Martian surface and near apoapsis (farthest from Mars in its orbit) the high gain antenna will be pointed towards Earth for uplink and downlink.

After 100 days the apoapsis was lowered to 10,107 km and periapsis raised to 298 km to give an orbital period of 6.7 hours.

MARSIS deployment 

On May 4, 2005, Mars Express deployed the first of its two 20-metre-long radar booms for its MARSIS (Mars Advanced Radar for Subsurface and Ionosphere Sounding) experiment. At first the boom did not lock fully into place; however, exposing it to sunlight for a few minutes on May 10 fixed the glitch. The second 20 m boom was successfully deployed on June 14. Both 20 m booms were needed to create a 40 m dipole antenna for MARSIS to work; a less crucial 7-meter-long monopole antenna was deployed on June 17. The radar booms were originally scheduled to be deployed in April 2004, but this was delayed out of fear that the deployment could damage the spacecraft through a whiplash effect. Due to the delay it was decided to split the four-week commissioning phase in two parts, with two weeks running up to July 4 and another two weeks in December 2005.

The deployment of the booms was a critical and highly complex task requiring effective inter-agency cooperation ESA, NASA, Industry and public Universities.

Nominal science observations began during July 2005. (For more info see, and ESA Portal - Mars Express radar ready to work ESA press release.)

Operations of the spacecraft 
Operations for Mars Express are carried out by a multinational team of engineers from ESA's Operation Centre (ESOC) in Darmstadt. The team began preparations for the mission about 3 to 4 years prior to the actual launch. This involved preparing the ground segment and the operational procedures for the whole mission.

The Mission Control Team is composed of the Flight Control Team, Flight Dynamics Team, Ground Operations Managers, Software Support and Ground Facilities Engineers. All of these are located at ESOC but there are additionally external teams, such as the Project and Industry Support teams, who designed and built the spacecraft.
The Flight Control Team currently consists of:

 The Spacecraft Operations Manager
 Six Operations Engineers (including three Mission Planners)
 One Spacecraft Analyst
 Six spacecraft controllers (SpaCons), shared with ExoMars Trace Gas Orbiter, BepiColombo and Solar Orbiter.

The team build-up, headed by the Spacecraft Operations Manager, started about 4 years before launch. He was required to recruit a suitable team of engineers that could handle the varying tasks involved in the mission. For Mars Express the engineers came from various other missions. Most of them had been involved with Earth orbiting satellites.

Routine phase: science return 

Since orbit insertion Mars Express has been progressively fulfilling its original scientific goals. Nominally the spacecraft points to Mars while acquiring science and then slews to Earth-pointing to downlink the data, although some instruments like Marsis or Radio Science might be operated while spacecraft is Earth-pointing.

Orbiter and subsystems

Structure 
The Mars Express orbiter is a cube-shaped spacecraft with two solar panel wings extending from opposite sides. The launch mass of 1223 kg includes a main bus with 113 kg of payload, the 60 kg lander, and 457 kg of propellant. The main body is 1.5 m × 1.8 m × 1.4 m in size, with an aluminium honeycomb structure covered by an aluminium skin. The solar panels measure about 12 m tip-to-tip. Two 20 m long wire dipole antennas extend from opposite side faces perpendicular to the solar panels as part of the radar sounder.

Propulsion 
The Soyuz/Fregat launcher provided most of the thrust Mars Express needed to reach Mars. The final stage of the Fregat was jettisoned once the probe was safely on a course for Mars. The spacecraft's on-board means of propulsion was used to slow the probe for Mars orbit insertion and subsequently for orbit corrections.

The body is built around the main propulsion system, which consists of a bipropellant 400 N main engine. The two 267-liter propellant tanks have a total capacity of 595 kg. Approximately 370 kg are needed for the nominal mission. Pressurized helium from a 35-liter tank is used to force fuel into the engine. Trajectory corrections will be made using a set of eight 10 N thrusters, one attached to each corner of the spacecraft bus. The spacecraft configuration is optimized for a Soyuz/Fregat, and was fully compatible with a Delta II launch vehicle.

Power 
Spacecraft power is provided by the solar panels which contain 11.42 square meters of silicon cells. The originally planned power was to be 660W at 1.5AU but a faulty connection has reduced the amount of power available by 30%, to about 460W. This loss of power does significantly impact the science return of the mission. Power is stored in three lithium-ion batteries with a total capacity of 64.8Ah for use during eclipses. The power is fully regulated at 28V, and the Terma power module (also used in Rosetta) is redundant. During routine phase, the spacecraft's power consumption is in the range of 450–550W.

Avionics 
Attitude control (3-axis stabilization) is achieved using two 3-axis inertial measurement units, a set of two star cameras and two Sun sensors, gyroscopes, accelerometers, and four 12 N·m·s reaction wheels. Pointing accuracy is 0.04 degree with respect to the inertial reference frame and 0.8 degree with respect to the Mars orbital frame. Three on-board systems help Mars Express maintain a very precise pointing accuracy, which is essential to allow the spacecraft to use some of the science instruments.

Communications 
The communications subsystem is composed of 3 antennas: A 1.6 m diameter parabolic dish high-gain antenna and two omnidirectional antennas. The first one provide links (telecommands uplink and telemetry downlink) in both X-band (8.4 GHz) and S-band (2.1 GHz) and is used during nominal science phase around Mars. The low gain antennas are used during launch and early operations to Mars and for eventual contingencies once in orbit.
Two Mars lander relay UHF antennas are mounted on the top face for communication with the Beagle 2 or other landers, using a Melacom transceiver.

Earth stations 
Although communications with Earth were originally scheduled to take place with the ESA 35-meter wide Ground Station in New Norcia (Australia) New Norcia Station, the mission profile of progressive enhancement and science return flexibility have triggered the use of the ESA ESTRACK Ground Stations in Cebreros Station, Madrid, Spain and Malargüe Station, Argentina.

In addition, further agreements with NASA Deep Space Network have made possible the use of American stations for nominal mission planning, thus increasing complexity but with a clear positive impact in scientific returns.

This inter-agency cooperation has proven effective, flexible and enriching for both sides. On the technical side, it has been made possible (among other reasons) thanks to the adoption of both Agencies of the Standards for Space Communications defined in CCSDS.

Thermal 
Thermal control is maintained through the use of radiators, multi-layer insulation, and actively controlled heaters. The spacecraft must provide a benign environment for the instruments and on-board equipment. Two instruments, PFS and OMEGA, have infrared detectors that need to be kept at very low temperatures (about −180 °C). The sensors on the camera (HRSC) also need to be kept cool. But the rest of the instruments and on-board equipment function best at room temperatures (10–20 °C).

The spacecraft is covered in gold-plated aluminium-tin alloy thermal blankets to maintain a temperature of 10–20 °C inside the spacecraft. The instruments that operate at low temperatures to be kept cold are thermally insulated from this relatively high internal temperature, and emit excess heat into space using attached radiators.

Control unit and data storage 
The spacecraft is run by two Control and Data management Units with 12 gigabits of solid state mass memory for storage of data and housekeeping information for transmission. The on-board computers control all aspects of the spacecraft functioning including switching instruments on and off, assessing the spacecraft orientation in space and issuing commands to change it.

Another key aspect of the Mars Express mission is its artificial intelligence tool (MEXAR2). The primary purpose of the AI tool is the scheduling of when to download various parts of the collected scientific data back to Earth, a process which used to take ground controllers a significant amount of time. The new AI tool saves operator time, optimizes bandwidth use on the DSN, prevents data loss, and allows better use of the DSN for other space operations as well. The AI decides how to manage the spacecraft's 12 gigabits of storage memory, when the DSN will be available and not be in use by another mission, how to make the best use of the DSN bandwidth allocated to it, and when the spacecraft will be oriented properly to transmit back to Earth.

Lander 

The Beagle 2 lander objectives were to characterize the landing site geology, mineralogy, and geochemistry, the physical properties of the atmosphere and surface layers, collect data on Martian meteorology and climatology, and search for possible signatures of life. However, the landing attempt was unsuccessful and the lander was declared lost. A Commission of Inquiry on Beagle 2 identified several possible causes, including airbag problems, severe shocks to the lander's electronics which had not been simulated adequately before launch, and problems with parts of the landing system colliding; but was unable to reach any firm conclusions. The spacecraft's fate remained a mystery until it was announced in January 2015 that NASA's Mars Reconnaissance Orbiter, using HiRISE, had found the probe intact on the surface of Mars. It was then determined that an error had prevented two of the spacecraft's four solar panels from deploying, blocking the spacecraft's communications. Beagle 2 was the first British and first European probe to achieve a landing on Mars.

Scientific instruments 
The scientific objectives of the Mars Express payload are to obtain global high-resolution photo-geology (10 m resolution), mineralogical mapping (100 m resolution) and mapping of the atmospheric composition, study the subsurface structure, the global atmospheric circulation, and the interaction between the atmosphere and the subsurface, and the atmosphere and the interplanetary medium. The total mass budgeted for the science payload is 116 kg. The payload scientific instruments are:

 Visible and Infrared Mineralogical Mapping Spectrometer (OMEGA) (Observatoire pour la Minéralogie, l'Eau, les Glaces et l'Activité) – France – Determines mineral composition of the surface up to 100 m resolution. Is mounted inside pointing out the top face. Instrument mass: 28.6 kg
 Ultraviolet and Infrared Atmospheric Spectrometer (SPICAM) – France – Assesses elemental composition of the atmosphere. Is mounted inside pointing out the top face. Instrument mass: 4.7 kg
 Sub-Surface Sounding Radar Altimeter (MARSIS) – Italy – A radar altimeter used to assess composition of sub-surface aimed at search for frozen water. Is mounted in the body and is nadir pointing, and also incorporates the two 20 m antennas. Instrument mass: 13.7 kg
 Planetary Fourier Spectrometer (PFS) – Italy – Makes observations of atmospheric temperature and pressure (observations suspended in September 2005). Is mounted inside pointing out the top face and is currently working. Instrument mass: 30.8 kg
 Analyzer of Space Plasmas and Energetic Atoms (ASPERA) – Sweden – Investigates interactions between upper atmosphere and solar wind. Is mounted on the top face. Instrument mass: 7.9 kg
 High Resolution Stereo Camera (HRSC) – Germany – Produces color images with up to 2 m resolution. Is mounted inside the spacecraft body, aimed through the top face of the spacecraft, which is nadir pointing during Mars operations. Instrument mass: 20.4 kg
 Mars Express Lander Communications (MELACOM) – UK – Allows Mars Express to act as a communication relay for landers on the Martian surface. (Has been used on both Mars Exploration Rovers, and was used to support the landing of NASA's Phoenix mission)
 Mars Radio Science Experiment (MaRS) – Uses radio signals to investigate atmosphere, surface, subsurface, gravity and solar corona density during solar conjunctions. It uses the communications subsystem itself.
 Visual Monitoring Camera, a small camera to monitor the lander ejection.

Scientific discoveries and important events 
For more than 20,000 orbits, Mars Express payload instruments have been nominally and regularly operated. The HRSC camera has been consistently mapping the Martian surface with unprecedented resolution and has acquired multiple images.

2004 
 January 23
 ESA announced the discovery of water ice in the south polar ice cap, using data collected by the OMEGA instrument.

 January 28
 Mars Express orbiter reaches final science orbit altitude around Mars.

 March 17
 Orbiter detects polar ice caps that contain 85% carbon dioxide (CO2) ice and 15% water ice.

 March 30
 A press release announces that the orbiter has detected methane in the Martian atmosphere. Although the amount is small, about 10 parts in a thousand million, it has excited scientists to question its source. Since methane is removed from the Martian atmosphere very rapidly, there must be a current source that replenishes it. Because one of the possible sources could be microbial life, it is planned to verify the reliability of these data and especially watch for difference in the concentration in various places on Mars. It is hoped that the source of this gas can be discovered by finding its location of release.

 April 28
 ESA announced that the deployment of the boom carrying the radar-based MARSIS antenna was delayed. It described concerns with the motion of the boom during deployment, which can cause the spacecraft to be struck by elements of it. Further investigations are planned to make sure that this will not happen.

 July 15
 Scientists working with the PFS instrument announced that they tentatively discovered the spectral features of the compound ammonia in the Martian atmosphere. Just like methane discovered earlier (see above), ammonia breaks down rapidly in Mars' atmosphere and needs to be constantly replenished. This points towards the existence of active life or geological activity; two contending phenomena whose presence so far have remained undetected.

2005 
 In 2005, ESA scientists reported that the OMEGA (Visible and Infrared Mineralogical Mapping Spectrometer)(Observatoire pour la Minéralogie, l'Eau, les Glaces et l'Activité) instrument data indicates the presence of hydrated sulphates, silicates and various rock-forming minerals.
 February 8
 The delayed deployment of the MARSIS antenna has been given a green light by ESA. It is planned to take place in early May 2005.

 May 5
 The first boom of the MARSIS antenna was successfully deployed. At first, there was no indication of any problems, but later it was discovered that one segment of the boom did not lock. The deployment of the second boom was delayed to allow for further analysis of the problem.

 May 11
 Using the Sun's heat to expand the segments of the MARSIS antenna, the last segment locked in successfully.

 June 14
 The second boom was deployed, and on June 16 ESA announced it was a success.
 June 22
 ESA announces that MARSIS is fully operational and will soon begin acquiring data. This comes after the deployment of the third boom on June 17, and a successful transmission test on June 19.

2006 

 September 21
 The High Resolution Stereo Camera (HRSC) has obtained images of the Cydonia region, the location of the famous "Face on Mars". The massif became famous in a photo taken in 1976 by the American Viking 1 Orbiter. The image recorded with a ground resolution of approximately 13.7 metres per pixel.

 September 26
 The Mars Express spacecraft emerged from an unusually demanding eclipse introducing a special, ultra-low-power mode nicknamed 'Sumo' – an innovative configuration aimed at saving the power necessary to ensure spacecraft survival.
This mode was developed through teamwork between ESOC mission controllers, principal investigators, industry, and mission management.

 October
 In October 2006 the Mars Express spacecraft encountered a superior solar conjunction (alignment of Earth-Sun-Mars-orbiter). The angle Sun-Earth-orbiter reached a minimum on October 23 at 0.39° at a distance of 2.66 AU. Operational measures were undertaken to minimize the impact of the link degradation, since the higher density of electrons in the solar plasma heavily impacts the radio frequency signal.

 December
 Following the loss of NASA's Mars Global Surveyor (MGS), Mars Express team was requested to perform actions in the hopes of visually identifying the American spacecraft. Based on last ephemeris of MGS provided by JPL, the on-board high definition HRSC camera swept a region of the MGS orbit. Two attempts were made to find the craft, both unsuccessful.

2007 

 January
 First agreements with NASA undertaken for the support by Mars Express on the landing of the American lander Phoenix in May 2008.

 February
 The small camera VMC (used only once to monitor the lander ejection) was recommissioned and first steps were taken to offer students the possibility to participate in a campaign "Command Mars Express Spacecraft and take your own picture of Mars".

 February 23
 As result of the science return, the Science Program Committee (SPC) granted a mission extension until May 2009.

 June 28
 The High Resolution Stereo Camera (HRSC) has produced images of key tectonic features in Aeolis Mensae.

2008 
 The Mars Express Team was the winner of the Sir Arthur Clarke Award for Best Team Achievement.

2009 
 February 4
 The ESA's Science Programme Committee has extended the operations of Mars Express until December 31, 2009.

October 7
ESA's Science Programme Committee has approved the extension of mission operations for Mars Express until December 31, 2012.

2010 
March 5
Flyby of Phobos to measure Phobos' gravity.

2011 
August 13
Safe mode following a Solid-State Mass Memory problem.
August 23
Solid-State Mass Memory problem.
September 23
Safe mode following a Solid-State Mass Memory problem.
October 11
Solid-State Mass Memory problem.
October 16
Safe mode following a Solid-State Mass Memory problem.
November 24
Science operations are resumed using the Short Mission Timeline and Command Files instead of the Long Time Line resident on the suspect Solid-State Mass Memory.

2012 
 February 16
Resumes full science operations. There is still enough fuel for up to 14 additional years of operation.
 July
Solar corona studied with radio waves.
 August 5/6
 Assisted US probes Mars Odyssey and Mars Reconnaissance Orbiter in data collection and transfer on the Mars Science Laboratory landing.

2013 
Mars Express produced a near-complete topographical map of Mars' surface.
December 29
Mars Express performed the closest flyby to date of Phobos

2014 
 October 19
ESA reported Mars Express was healthy after the Comet Siding Spring flyby of Mars on October 19, 2014 — as were all NASA Mars orbiters and ISRO's orbiter, the Mars Orbiter Mission.

2016 
 October 19
 Assisted with data collection and transfer for the Schiaparelli EDM lander landing.

2017
June 19
Takes noted image spanning from the North pole up to Alba Mons and even farther south. The image was released in December 20, 2017 and was captured by HRSC.

2018
Activated new AOCMS software which includes a gyroless attitude estimator to prolong the lifetime of the spacecraft's laser gyros
 December 2018 Mars Express relays images of the 80-kilometer wide Korolev Crater filled with approximately 2200 cubic kilometers of water ice on the Martian surface. Based on further evidence the crater ice is still part of much vaster ice resources at Mars poles.

2019
Based on data from the HRSC camera, there is geological evidence of an ancient  planet-wide groundwater system.

2020
It is surrounded by 3 smaller lakes, each a few kilometres wide.

2021 

 Investigation of orographic cloud extending from Arsia Mons volcano
 An experiment to test whether the Mars Express and TGO lander relay communications radio could be used to perform occultation radio science
 Tests of data relay from the CNSA Zhurong Rover

2022 

 The onboard software of the MARSIS experiment was upgraded in order to improve the performance of the instrument.

Payload principal investigators links 
 HRSC Mars Express FU Berlin
 MARSIS Uni Roma "La Sapienza"
 PFS IFSI/INAF
 SPICAM
 OMEGA Institut Astrophysique Spatial
 MELACOM Qinetiq
 MRSE Uni Köln
 ASPERA

See also 

 
 
 
 List of Mars orbiters
 List of missions to Mars

References

External links 

 ESA Mars Express project – official website
 ESA Mars Express project – scientific website
 ESA Mars Express operations site
 Mars Express Mission Profile by NASA's Solar System Exploration
 First Mars Express Science Conference presentations (at MarsToday.com)
 NASA Art Gallery of Mars Express
 Can show present over head position of Mars Express
 Mars Express article on eoPortal by ESA

 

 
Express
Express
Mars Express
Mars Express
Geography of Mars
Attached spacecraft
Spacecraft launched by Soyuz-FG rockets